Bulgarograsso is a comune (municipality) in the Province of Como in the Italian region Lombardy, located about  northwest of Milan and about  southwest of Como.

Bulgarograsso borders the following municipalities: Appiano Gentile, Cassina Rizzardi, Guanzate, Lurate Caccivio, Villa Guardia.

Demographic evolution

References

Cities and towns in Lombardy